Camborne Treswithian was an electoral division of Cornwall in the United Kingdom which returned one member to sit on Cornwall Council between 2013 and 2021. It was abolished at the 2021 local elections, being succeeded by Camborne West and Treswithian.

Councillors

Extent
Camborne Treswithian represented the west of the town of Camborne, including the suburb of Treswithian, as well as the hamlets of Reskadinnick and Kehelland. The division covered 1239 hectares in total.

Election results

2017 election

2013 election

References

Electoral divisions of Cornwall Council
Camborne